(born June 9, 1974) is a Japanese comedian, professional wrestler and tarento ("talent") better known for his performing name of , which he adopted from his comedy partner Razor Ramon Hard Gay. He is better known for his work in Hustle and TV appearances.

Professional wrestling career
While at college he picked up wrestling as a hobby and soon joined the Doshisha Professional Wrestling Alliance (DWA). Along with his longtime friend Masaki "GiveUp" Sumitani, he won the tag team championship co-hosted by DWA and the Ritsumeikan Wrestling Alliance (RWA) of nearby Ritsumeikan University in Kyoto. Current New Japan Pro-Wrestling member Hiroshi Tanahashi was also a participant of these events.

In 2006, Izubuchi debuted in the pro wrestling promotion Hustle, where Sumitani was working as his character Razor Ramon Hard Gay. Izubuchi first appeared in Hustle auditions as a Hard Gay parody before renaming himself Razor Ramon Real Gay. His gimmick was similar to Hard Gay's, but adding a rastafari wig and a characteristic dance during his entrance. Initially working as Hustle's unpopular general manager along with Hiroko Suzuki, Real Gay was challenged by Monster Army member Kenzo Suzuki, Hiroko's husband, who stipulated that if he was the winner, she would be appointed the only GM. Unfortunately for RG, he was squashed by Suzuki and lost his job. RG then became a regular wrestler for the Hustle Army, but he proved to be a comically weak contender and spent his early years being brutally beaten by each opponent he faced. Despite his losses, his never-say-die attitude and charisma made turned him into a favorite among Hustle fans. He used a humorous wrestling style, wearing a red fundoshi under his tights (which he would display to perform his signature stink face) and selling exaggeratedly whenever he received an atomic drop. He formed a tag team with Hard Gay, which resembled their old manzai duo.

Comedy
It was through wrestling in their college years, that Izubuchi met Masaki Sumitani, with whom he would later form the comedy duo "Razor Ramon", the name inspired by the character portrayed by professional wrestler Scott Hall, in 1997. During their college years, Razor Ramon won the Fukuwarai award in the Imamiya Kids' Ebisu Manzai Contest and gained experience on the stage through the audition live performance SABUKI at 2chome-gekijo, an Osaka comedy club opened by the Yoshimoto Kogyo comedy troupe at which many comedians from the Kansai area start their career.

Years after, he reunited with Sumitani and officially joined Yoshimoto Kogyo. Razor Ramon made their TV debut in 1999 and won the Judges Special Award in the ABC Owarai (Comedy) Grand-Prix in 2000. Both Sumitani and Izubuchi joined the Yoshimoto Kogyo-produced program Yoshimoto Shin-kigeki in 2001, often playing yakuza, salaryman, udon restaurant owners, construction workers, and others.

Championships and accomplishments
All Japan Pro Wrestling
F-1 Tag Team Championship (1 time) - with Manabu Soya1

1Championship not officially recognized by All Japan Pro Wrestling.

Film

References

1974 births
Living people
Sportspeople from Kumamoto Prefecture
Japanese comedians
Japanese male professional wrestlers
LGBT characters in professional wrestling
People from Tamana, Kumamoto
F-1 Tag Team Champions